Elaiyur  is a village in the Kudavasal taluk of Tiruvarur district in Tamil Nadu, India.

Demographics 

 census, Elaiyur had a population of 2,025 with 961 males and 1,064 females. The sex ratio was 1107. The literacy rate was 77.19.

References 

 

Villages in Tiruvarur district